Naayi Neralu (meaning: Shadow of the Dog) is a novel written by S.L. Bhyrappa, which was first published on 1968. As of May 2018, it had 17 reprints and has been translated into Hindi and Gujarati languages. Based on the novel, a movie Naayi Neralu, in Kannada language was released in 2006, directed by Girish Kasaravalli.

The novel is about a young boy who claims to be the rebirth/reincarnation of a previous life.

See also

S. L. Bhyrappa's novels 

 Bheemakaaya
 Dharmashree
 Doora saridaru
 Matadana
 Tabbaliyu Neenade Magane
 Gruhabhanga
 Nirakarana
 Grahana
 Daatu
 Anveshana
 Parva
 Nele
 Sakshi
 Anchu
 Tantu
 Saartha
 Mandra
 Aavarana
 Kavalu
 Yaana
 Uttarakaanda

S. L. Bhyrappa's autobiography 

 Bhitti

References 

Kannada novels
1968 novels
1968 Indian novels
Indian novels adapted into films
Novels by S. L. Bhyrappa